"Make Me Shine" is a single by Echo & the Bunnymen which was released on 27 August 2001 on the Cooking Vinyl label. It was the second single to be released from the 2001 album, Flowers. It reached number 84 on the UK Singles Chart.

It was originally intended for this to be the first single released from the Flowers album, but this was changed and "It's Alright" was released first.

Track listings
"Make Me Shine" (Will Sergeant, Ian McCulloch) – 3:29
"Ticket to Ride" (Lennon–McCartney) – 3:21
"Nothing Lasts Forever" (acoustic) (Sergeant, McCulloch, Les Pattinson) – 3:33

Chart positions

References

External links
Lyrics at MTV.com

2001 singles
Echo & the Bunnymen songs
Songs written by Ian McCulloch (singer)
Songs written by Will Sergeant
2001 songs
Cooking Vinyl singles